National Highway 161, (may be referred to as NH 161), is a National Highway in India running through the states of Maharashtra and Telangana of India. The National Highway 161 joins the cities of Akola, Washim, Hingoli, Nanded, Degloor, Bichkunda, Pitlam, Nizampet, Shankarampet(A), Jogipet, Sanga Reddy.

and Hyderabad in Central-Southern India with each other.

Junctions

 At Akola with NH 6 connecting Hajira - Surat - Dhule - Akola - Amravati - Nagpur - Durg - Raipur - Mahasamund - Sambalpur - Baharagora - Kolkata
 At Akola with NH161A connecting Akot - Akola - Barshitakli - Mangrulpir - Digras - Arni - Mahur - Kinwat - Himayatnagar - Mudkhed - Nanded - Mukhed - Maharashtra-Karnataka border
 At Washim with NH 161E connecting Washim - Mangrulpir - Karanja - Hiwra Budruk on NH 6
 At Nanded with NH 222 connecting Kalyan - Ahmednagar - Pathardi - Parbhani - Basmat - Nanded - Nirmal
 At Nanded with NH 204 connecting Ratnagiri - Kolhapur - Sangli - Pandharpur - Solapur - Tuljapur - Latur - Nanded - Arni - Yavatmal - Wardha - Buti Bori - Nagpur
 At Sangareddy with NH 9 connecting Pune - Solapur - Omerga - Zaheerabad - Sangareddy - Secunderabad - Hyderabad - Suryapet - Vijayawada - Machilipatnam

States, districts, cities, towns and villages connected
The  Maharashtra and Telangana are the two states connected by the NH 161.

Maharashtra
 Akola district
 Akola - Kapshi - Patur
 Washim district
 Malegaon - Washim
 Hingoli district
 Hingoli - Kalamnuri
 Nanded district
 Ardhapur - Nanded - Degloor

Telangana
 Kamareddy district
 Madnoor - Bichkunda - Pitlam
 Sangareddy district
 Nizampet - Jogipet - Sangareddy

See also
 List of National Highways in India
 National Highway (India)

References

External links 

 NH 161 on OpenStreetMap

161
161
National highways in India